A parity game is played on a colored directed graph, where each node has been colored by a priority – one of (usually) finitely many natural numbers.  Two players, 0 and 1, move a (single, shared) token along the edges of the graph. The owner of the node that the token falls on selects the successor node, resulting in a (possibly infinite) path, called the play.

The winner of a finite play is the player whose opponent is unable to move. The winner of an infinite play is determined by the priorities appearing in the play. Typically, player 0 wins an infinite play if the largest priority that occurs infinitely often in the play is even. Player 1 wins otherwise. This explains the word "parity" in the title.

Parity games lie in the third level of the Borel hierarchy, and are consequently determined.

Games related to parity games were implicitly used in Rabin's
proof of decidability of the monadic second-order theory of n successors (S2S for n = 2), where determinacy of such games was
proven. The Knaster–Tarski theorem leads to a relatively simple proof of determinacy of parity games.

Moreover, parity games are history-free determined. This means that if a player has a winning strategy then that player has a winning strategy that depends only on the current board position, and not on the history of the play.

Solving a game

Solving a parity game played on a finite graph means deciding, for a given starting position, which of the two players has a winning strategy. It has been shown that this problem is in NP and co-NP, more precisely UP and co-UP, as well as in QP (quasipolynomial time). It remains an open question whether this decision problem is solvable in PTime.

Given that parity games are history-free determined, solving a given parity game is equivalent to solving the following simple looking graph-theoretic problem.

Recursive algorithm for solving parity games

Zielonka outlined a recursive algorithm that solves parity games.

Zielonka's algorithm is based on the notation of attractors. Let  be a set of nodes and  be a player. It can be defined by a fix-point computation:

 

In other words, one starts with the initial set . Then, for each step one adds all nodes belonging to player 0 that can reach the previous set with a single edge and all nodes belonging to player 1 that must reach the previous set no matter which edge player 1 takes.

Zielonka's algorithm is based on a recursive descent on the number of priorities. If the maximal priority is 0, it is immediate to see that player 0 wins the whole game (with an arbitrary strategy). Otherwise, let  be the largest one and let  be the player associated with the priority. Let  be the set of nodes with priority  and let  be the corresponding attractor of player .
Player  can now ensure that every play that visits  infinitely often is won by player .

We can now solve the smaller game  by recursion and obtain a pair of winning sets .

We again solve it by recursion and obtain a pair of winning sets .

In simple pseudocode, the algorithm might be expressed as this:

 function 
      := maximal priority in 
     if 
         return 
     else
         
         
         
         if 
             return 
         
         
         return

Related games and their decision problems
A slight modification of the above game, and the related graph-theoretic problem, makes solving the game NP-hard. The modified game has the Rabin acceptance condition.
Specifically, in the above bipartite graph scenario, the problem now is to determine if there
is a choice function selecting  a single out-going edge from each vertex of V0, such that the resulting subgraph has the property that in each cycle (and hence each strongly connected component) it is the case that there exists an i  and a node with color 2i, and no node with color 2i + 1...

Note that as opposed to parity games, this game is no longer symmetric with respect to players 0 and 1.

Relation with logic and automata theory

Despite its interesting complexity theoretic status, parity game solving can be seen as the algorithmic backend to problems in automated verification and controller synthesis. The model-checking problem for the modal μ-calculus for instance is known to be equivalent to parity game solving. Also, decision problems like validity or satisfiability for modal logics can be reduced to parity game solving.

References

Further reading 
 E. Grädel, W. Thomas, T. Wilke (Eds.) : Automata, Logics, and Infinite Games, Springer LNCS 2500 (2003), 
 W. Zielonka : Infinite games on finitely coloured graphs with applications to automata on infinite tree, TCS, 200(1-2):135-183, 1998

External links
Two state-of-the-art parity game solving toolsets are the following:
 PGSolver Collection
 Oink
Graph visualisation tool that can model and solve parity games:
 Workcraft

Game theory game classes
Finite model theory